Sprokkelbosch railway station was a railway station on the railway track Tilburg - Nijmegen. It was located near the hamlet of Sprokkelbosch between Rosmalen and Kruisstraat. The railway station was opened in 1881 and closed in 1938.

Railway stations in 's-Hertogenbosch
Railway stations opened in 1881
Railway stations closed in 1938
1881 establishments in the Netherlands
1938 disestablishments in the Netherlands
Railway stations in the Netherlands opened in the 19th century